Tranmere Oil Terminal is situated on the River Mersey,  south of Birkenhead. It was opened on 8 June 1960 to handle vessels of up to 65,000 tons, at two berths (North and South). It is connected to the Stanlow Oil Refinery by a  pipeline. Part of the terminal occupies the site of a former ferry service to Liverpool, with the extant pier considerably modified.

History 
The terminal was built jointly by Shell Oil, then the owner of Stanlow Oil Refinery, and the Mersey Docks and Harbour Board at a cost of £6 million. It was built to replace Eastham Oil Terminal which had only been inaugurated in 1954, but which did not have sufficient water depth to handle the 65,000 ton vessels that were operating by 1960.

By 2001, the terminal had two converted crude oil tanks which could handle . These were used for the storage of crude oil from the Foinaven oilfield.

Current operations 
All the crude oil feedstock for Stanlow Oil Refinery is delivered via the Tranmere terminal. The terminal is capable of handling vessels of up to 65,000 tonnes, and cargo sizes up to 170,000 tonnes on part laden Very Large Crude Carriers (VLCCs). Tranmere currently (2020) handles 140 ships every year, carrying a total of 9 million tonnes of crude oil.

The minimum water depth at Tranmere is 40 ft. (12.2 m), and there is a tidal range of 30 ft. (9.14 m).

The terminal is operated by the Mersey Docks and Harbour Company.

See also 

 Oil terminals in the United Kingdom
 UK oil pipeline network

References

Sources

External links

MultiMap

Buildings and structures in Birkenhead
Mersey docks
Petroleum infrastructure in the United Kingdom
Oil terminals
Peel Ports